Listed below are confirmed killer tornadoes listed by date in Southern Illinois, United States. Modern record keeping in the region began in the 1880s, although there were undoubtedly many other deaths that have been lost to history. It is important to note that before the 1950s tornadoes were not officially ranked. The current rankings are an estimation due to the accounts of witnesses.

Southern Illinois tornadoes by death toll

See also
 Climate of Illinois
 List of North American tornadoes and tornado outbreaks
 St. Louis tornado history

References

External links
 The Tri-State Tornado (The Tornado Project)
 1925 Tri-State Tornado (NWS Paducah, Kentucky)
 The Weather Channel's Storm of the Century list - #7 The Tri-State Tornado
 The Great Tri-State Tornado (RootsWeb Genealogy)
 Newspaper Coverage of the Tri-State Tornado Ravage of Murphysboro (NIU Library)
 Tri-State Tornado: Missouri, Illinois, Indiana, March 1925 (Popular Mechanics)
 The 1925 Tornado (Carolyar.com Genealogy)
 1925 Monster Tornado Killed Hundreds Led to Development of Warning System 

Books
 The Tri-State Tornado: The Story of America's Greatest Tornado Disaster, by Peter S. Felknor. Ames, Iowa: Iowa State University Press, 1992. 131 pages. .
 The Forgotten Storm: The Great Tri-state Tornado of 1925, by Wallace E. Akin. Guilford, Connecticut: Lyons Press, 2002. 173 pages. .

 Southern Illinois
 Southern Illinois
Southern Illinois
Southern Illinois
 Southern Illinois
Tornado history
Tornado history
Tornado history
Tornado history
Tornado history
Tornado history
Tornado history
Tornado history
Tornado history
Tornado history
Tornado history